Pan Suiming (born 1950) is a Chinese sexologist and professor at the Renmin University of China who has taught sexology for more than 30 years. He is hailed as "the First Person in Sexology in China".

Early life
Pan was born in 1950 to an official family. At the age of 9, his father was classified as right winger and suffered unfair treatment. In 1966, Mao Zedong launched the ten-year Cultural Revolution, Pan became a sent-down youth at a state farm in Heilongjiang province.

Education
Pan attended Northeast Normal University, where he majored in history.

Career
Pan was assigned to the Renmin University of China as a teacher. In 1985 he began to teach sexual sociology.

Pan's first book, Mysterious Fire: Sociological History of Sex, was published in 1988. He founded the Institute for Research on Sexuality and Gender at the Renmin University in 1991. He was a visiting scholar at the University of Michigan (1993–1993) and University of Wales (1994–1995).

He is one of the pioneers in researching and teaching sexology in China and a published author.

Personal life
Pan is married and has a daughter.

Works

Translations

Papers

References

External links
 Pan's Sina Blog 

1950 births
Northeast Normal University alumni
Living people
Academic staff of Renmin University of China
Chinese sexologists